Motoharu Kawashima (川島素晴; surname Kawashima; born 12 January 1972 in Tokyo, Japan) is a Japanese composer of contemporary classical music.

Kawashima studied composition from 1991 to 1996 with Isao Matsushita and Jo Kondo at the Tokyo National University of Fine Arts and Music. He won the Akiyoshidai International Composition Prize and made his debut in Akiyoshidai International 20th Century Classical Music Festival in 1992. Currently, he teaches composition at the Kunitachi College of Music.

His scores are published by the Zen-On Music Company Ltd Limited Baerenreiter.

References 

1972 births
Japanese classical composers
Japanese contemporary classical composers
Japanese male classical composers
Living people
Musicians from Tokyo
Tokyo University of the Arts alumni